Cemal Tiğin (born 15 March 1913, date of death unknown) was a Turkish cross-country skier. He competed in the men's 18 kilometre event at the 1936 Winter Olympics.

References

1913 births
Year of death missing
Turkish male cross-country skiers
Olympic cross-country skiers of Turkey
Cross-country skiers at the 1936 Winter Olympics
Place of birth missing
20th-century Turkish people